Brett Anderson is the first solo release from Suede and The Tears frontman Brett Anderson. It was released on 26 March 2007 by Drowned in Sound Recordings.

Background
In May 2006, Anderson announced sketchy details for the album. He told NME that the title will be 'Brett Anderson' since "...that's my name, you see." The album was recorded whilst Anderson was recording The Tears' debut album alongside Bernard Butler.

Anderson has described the record as being "...quite orchestrated, lots of string loops, that sort of thing. I guess there's a Scott Walker feel to it. I'm very proud of it; it's a very exciting record for me."

The album sees Anderson taking on many more instruments than ever before. "I've played a lot of electric guitar on it; I've written a lot of the electric guitar parts. It's my baby and I've obviously been pretty obsessed with it."

The cover was designed by Peter Saville, with photography by Wolfgang Tillmans.

Reception
The album received mixed reviews from critics. At Metacritic, which assigns a normalized rating out of 100 to reviews from mainstream critics, the album has an average score of 51 out of 100, which indicates "mixed or average reviews" based on 11 reviews.

Commercial performance
The album was not a commercial success, charting at no. 54 on the UK Albums Chart.

Track listing

Personnel 

 Brett Anderson - vocals, acoustic guitar, additional electric guitar, percussion, producer
 Fred Ball – keyboards, programming, producer, string arrangements
 Jim Dare – guitars
 Bastian Juel – bass
 Kristoffer Sonne – drums
 The Dirty Pretty Strings – strings
 Jim Hunt – flute on "Scorpio Rising"
 Kwame Ogoo - additional backing vocals on "One Lazy Morning"
Technical
 Bunt Stafford Clark – mastering
 Steve Fitzmaurice – mixing
 Dyre Gormsen – engineer
 Peter Saville – artwork
 Howard Wakefield – artwork

Charts

References

2007 debut albums
Brett Anderson albums
albums produced by Fred Ball (producer)